This is a timeline of events involving the Golden Horde (1242–1502), from 1459 also known as the Great Horde.

13th century
For pre-1242 events involving Mongols in Europe, see Timeline of the Mongol Empire § 13th century

1240s

1250s

1260s

1270s

1280s

1290s

14th century

1300s

1310s

1320s

1330s

1340s

1350s

1360s

1370s

1380s

1390s

15th century

1400s

1410s

1420s

1430s

1440s

1450s

1460s

1470s

1480s

16th century

Gallery

See also
Timeline of the Yuan dynasty
Timeline of the Ilkhanate
Timeline of the Chagatai Khanate
Timeline of Mongolian history
Timeline of Mongols prior to the Mongol Empire

References

Bibliography
 .

 (alk. paper) 
 

 

  (originally published in 1987).

  (paperback).
 

 
 .

  (e-book).

 

 
 

 
 

 

 

 
  
 

 
 

Golden Horde